The Giving Tree is an American children's picture book written and illustrated by Shel Silverstein. First published in 1964 by Harper & Row, it has become one of Silverstein's best-known titles, and it has been translated into numerous languages.

This book has been described as "one of the most divisive books in children's literature"; the controversy stems from whether the relationship between the main characters (a boy and the eponymous tree) should be interpreted as positive (i.e., the tree gives the boy selfless love) or negative (i.e., the boy and the tree have an abusive relationship).

Background
Silverstein had difficulty finding a publisher for The Giving Tree. An editor at Simon & Schuster rejected the book's manuscript because he felt that it was "too sad" for children and "too simple" for adults. Tomi Ungerer encouraged Silverstein to approach Ursula Nordstrom, who was a publisher with Harper & Row.

An editor with Harper & Row stated that Silverstein had made the original illustrations "scratchy" like his cartoons for Playboy, but that he later reworked the art in a "more pared-down and much sweeter style." The final black-and-white drawings have been described as "unadorned… visual minimalism." Harper & Row published a small first edition of the book, consisting of only 5,000–7,500 copies, in 1964.

Plot
The book follows the lives of an apple tree and a boy, who develop a relationship with one another.  The tree is very "giving" and the boy evolves into a "taking" teenager, a middle-aged man, and finally an elderly man.  Despite the fact that the boy ages in the story, the tree addresses the boy as "Boy" his entire life.

In his childhood, the boy enjoys playing with the tree, climbing her trunk, swinging from her branches, carving "Me + T (Tree)" into the bark, and eating her apples. However, as the boy grows older, he spends less time with the tree and tends to visit her only when he wants material items at various stages of his life, or not coming to the tree alone (such as bringing a lady friend to the tree and carving "Me +Y.L." (her initials, often assumed to be an acronym for "young love") into the tree. In an effort to make the boy happy at each of these stages, the tree gives him parts of herself, which he can transform into material items, such as money (from her apples), a house (from her branches), and a boat (from her trunk).  With every stage of giving, "the Tree was happy."

In the final pages, both the tree and the boy feel the sting of their respective "giving" and "taking" nature.  When only a stump remains for the tree (including the carving "Me + T"), she is not happy, at least at that moment.  The boy returns as a tired elderly man to meet the tree once more. She tells him she is sad because she cannot provide him shade, apples, or any materials like in the past. He ignores this (because his teeth are too weak for apples, and he is too old to swing on branches and too tired to climb her trunk) and states that all he wants is "a quiet place to sit and rest," which the tree, who is weak being just a stump, could provide.  With this final stage of giving, "the Tree was happy."

Reception
Interest in the book increased by word of mouth; for example, in churches "it was hailed as a parable on the joys of giving."  As of 2001, over 5 million copies of the book had been sold, placing it 14th on a list of hardcover "All-Time Bestselling Children's Books" from Publishers Weekly.  By 2011, 8.5 million copies of the book had been sold.

In a 1999–2000, National Education Association online survey of children, among the "Kids' Top 100 Books," the book was 24th.  In the 2007 online "Teachers' Top 100 Books for Children" poll by the National Education Association, the book came in third. It was 85th of the "Top 100 Picture Books" of all time in a 2012 poll by School Library Journal. Scholastic Parent & Child magazine placed it #9 on its list of "100 Greatest Books for Kids" in 2012.  As of 2013, it ranked third on a Goodreads list of "Best Children's Books."

Interpretations 

There are numerous interpretations of the book, including:

The Religious interpretations 
Ursula Nordstrom attributed the book's success partially to "Protestant ministers and Sunday-school teachers", who believed that the tree represents "the Christian ideal of unconditional love."

Environmental interpretation
Some have interpreted the tree as Mother Nature and the boy represents humanity. The book has been used to teach children environmental ethics. An educational resource for children describes the book as an "allegory about the responsibilities a human being has for living organisms in the environment," Lisa Rowe Fraustino states that “some curricula use the book as a what-not-to-do role model."

Friendship interpretation
One writer believes that the relationship between the boy and the tree is one of friendship.  As such, the book teaches children "as your life becomes polluted with the trappings of the modern world — as you 'grow up' — your relationships tend to suffer if you let them fall to the wayside." Another writer's criticism of this interpretation is that the tree appears to be an adult when the boy is young, and cross-generational friendships are rare. Additionally, this relationship can be seen from a humanities perspective, emphasizing the need for helping each other.

Mother–child interpretations
A common interpretation of the book is that the tree and the boy have a mother–son relationship, as in a 1995 collection of essays about the book edited by Richard John Neuhaus in the journal First Things.  Among the essayists, some were positive about the relationship; for example, Amy A. Kass wrote about the story that "it is wise and it is true about giving and about motherhood," and her husband Leon R. Kass encourages people to read the book because the tree "is an emblem of the sacred memory of our own mother's love." Other essayists put forth negative views. Mary Ann Glendon wrote that the book is "a nursery tale for the 'me' generation, a primer of narcissism, a catechism of exploitation," and Jean Bethke Elshtain felt that the story ends with the tree and the boy "both wrecks."

A 1998 study using phenomenographic methods found that Swedish children and mothers tended to interpret the book as dealing with friendship, while Japanese mothers tended to interpret the book as dealing with parent–child relationships.

Interpretation as satire
Some authors believe that the book is not actually intended for children, but instead should be treated as a satire aimed at adults along the lines of A Modest Proposal by Jonathan Swift.

Criticism and controversy 
Elizabeth Bird, writing for the School Library Journal, described The Giving Tree as "one of the most divisive books in children's literature". Criticism revolves about the depiction of the relationship between the boy and the tree.

Winter Prosapio said that the boy never thanks the tree for its gifts. In an interview with Horn Book Magazine, Phyllis J. Fogelman, an editor with Harper & Row, said the book is "about a sadomasochistic relationship" and "elevates masochism to the level of a good", which mirrors Mary Daly's analysis in Gyn/Ecology: the Metaethics of Radical Feminism.

One college instructor discovered that the book caused both male and female remedial reading students to be angry because they felt that the boy exploited the tree. For teaching purposes, he paired the book with a short story by Andre Dubus entitled "The Fat Girl" because its plot can be described as The Giving Tree "in reverse."

Some readers may interpret the book against the wider background of Silverstein's interactions with women, e.g., that he frequented the Playboy Mansion and Playboy Clubs, and allegedly, according to his biography A Boy Named Shel, slept with hundreds, perhaps thousands of women.

Christopher Westley writing for the Mises Institute describes the tree-boy relationship as similar to a socialist or communist government that extracts far too much from its citizens while not providing anything back in return. He describes this unsustainable and parasitic relationship as something toxic and ought to be avoided at all costs; regardless of whether on an individual level, such as two lovers, or a parent and child, or on the level of voter to his or her government.

Ruth Margalit further relayed the damaging message that mothers sometimes have by receiving The Giving Tree as a gift; she quotes children's-book author Laurel Snyder who said, "When you give a new mother ten copies of ‘The Giving Tree,’ it does send a message to the mother that we are supposed to be this person."

Author's photograph 

The photograph of Silverstein on the back cover of the book has attracted negative attention, with some people finding it frightening. 

This photograph and the attention it received was touched upon in the children's novel Diary of a Wimpy Kid: The Last Straw by author Jeff Kinney. Protagonist Greg Heffley states that the photograph of Silverstein on the back cover of The Giving Tree terrified him as a child, and that his father would exploit this fear, saying to his son that if he got out of bed at night, he would "probably run into Shel Silverstein in the hallway".

Cultural influences and adaptations

Other versions
A short animated film of the book, produced in 1973, featured Silverstein's narration.

Silverstein also wrote a song of the same name, which was performed by Bobby Bare and his family on his album Singin' in the Kitchen (1974).

Silverstein created an adult version of the story in a cartoon entitled "I Accept the Challenge." In the cartoon, a nude woman cuts off a nude man's arms and legs with scissors, then sits on his torso in a pose similar to the final drawing in The Giving Tree in which the old man sits on the stump.

Jackson and Dell (1979) wrote an "alternative version" of the story for teaching purposes that was entitled "The Other Giving Tree." It featured two trees next to each other and a boy growing up.  One tree acted like the one in The Giving Tree, ending up as a stump, while the other tree stopped at giving the boy apples, and does not give the boy its branches or trunk. At the end of the story, the stump was sad that the old man chose to sit under the shade of the other tree.

Cultural influences
The Giving Tree Band took its name from the book. Plain White T's EP Should've Gone to Bed has a song “The Giving Tree,” written by Tim Lopez. The 2010 short film I'm Here, written and directed by Spike Jonze, is based on The Giving Tree; the main character Sheldon is named after Shel Silverstein.

In the A&E drama series Bates Motel, antagonist Norma Bates references The Giving Tree when describing parenthood: “Parents do not have needs. You ever read the book “The Giving Tree”? It's about a tree, and this kid keeps coming and taking stuff from it his whole life, until there's nothing left but a stump. And then the kid sits on the stump. That's being a parent.”

References

Further reading

External links

1964 children's books
Children's books adapted into films
Books by Shel Silverstein
American picture books
Environmental fiction books
Fictional trees
Harper & Row books